George Sanger, also known as "The Fat Man", is an American musician who has composed music for computer and video games, beginning in 1983. Some of his best-known works include The 7th Guest, Wing Commander, Hard Nova, Maniac Mansion (NES version), Loom, Tux Racer, and Zombies Ate My Neighbors. Sanger leads the band Team Fat, which also includes fellow video game music composers Dave Govett, Joe McDermott and Kevin Weston Phelan. He has also written a novel, The Fat Man on Game Audio: Tasty Morsels of Sonic Goodness, described by him as, "a book about game audio wrapped in a biography wrapped in a philosophy on life."

Works

Albums

George Sanger and Team Fat have released three albums:
7/11 – based on the music from The 7th Guest and The 11th Hour
Surf.com
Flabby Rode

Games

Awards and recognition
On March 7, 2007, Sanger received the IGDA Award For Community Contribution. The award was given for his numerous programs that encourage interactive audio innovation and industry improvement.

On March 5, 2015 George Sanger received the Game Audio Network Guild (GANG) Lifetime Achievement Award.

References

External links
Homepage of The Fat Man & Team Fat

Artist profile at OverClocked ReMix

"Hangin with The Fat Man" Wired Magazine: Poole, Gary Andrew (Mar. 1997)
Project Bar-B-Q Annual Interactive Music Conference: A Conference Hosted by The Fat Man
Fat Man in the Gastrokunst-Project of Austrian art-collective Monochrom

21st-century American composers
21st-century American male musicians
American bandleaders
American male composers
American male songwriters
Living people
Video game composers
Year of birth missing (living people)